The Krynica Morska Lighthouse is an active lighthouse in the town of Krynica Morska, Pomeranian Voivodship, Poland.

History 
The original lighthouse was built in 1895. It had a Fresnel lens, a 2 sec on / 4 sec off characteristics, and visibility of 18 nautical miles. The source was an oil-fueled flame, converted in 1938 to electric light. This original lighthouse was destroyed in 1945 after being mined by retreating German forces. A new lighthouse, now open to visitors, was built in 1951. Adjacent to it is a small cemetery with a monument to the Soviet soldiers killed in the explosion that destroyed the original building.

See also 

 List of lighthouses in Poland

References

External links 

 
 Urząd Morski w Słupsku  
 Latarnia morska (Krynica Morska) na portalu polska-org.pl

Lighthouses completed in 1885
Towers completed in 1895
Lighthouses completed in 1951
Lighthouses in Poland
Nowy Dwór Gdański County
Buildings and structures in Pomeranian Voivodeship
Tourist attractions in Pomeranian Voivodeship